The 2019 Grambling State Tigers football team represents Grambling State University in the 2019 NCAA Division I FCS football season. The Tigers are led by sixth-year head coach Broderick Fobbs and play their home games at Eddie Robinson Stadium in Grambling, Louisiana as members of the West Division of the Southwestern Athletic Conference (SWAC).

Previous season

The Tigers finished the 2018 season 6–5, 4–3 in SWAC play to finish tied for second place in the West Division.

Preseason

Recruiting class
Reference: 

|}

Preseason polls
The SWAC released their preseason poll on July 16, 2019. The Tigers were picked to finish in third place in the West Division.

Preseason all–SWAC teams
The Tigers placed four players on the preseason all–SWAC teams.

Offense

2nd team

William Waddell – OL

Defense

1st team

Anferenee Mullins – DL

Joseph McWilliams – DB

2nd team

Daquarian Williams – DB

Roster

Schedule

The Alabama A&M and Jackson State games are scheduled as non-conference games despite being members of the same conference.
Sources:

Game summaries

at Louisiana–Monroe

at Louisiana Tech

at Alabama State

vs. Prairie View A&M

at Jackson State

Alabama A&M

at Arkansas–Pine Bluff

Texas Southern

Alcorn State

at Mississippi Valley State

vs. Southern

References

Grambling State
Grambling State Tigers football seasons
Grambling State Tigers football